Institute of Geological Sciences may refer to 

 British Geological Survey
 Institute of Geological Sciences of the National Academy of Sciences of Ukraine, a research institute of the National Academy of Sciences of Ukraine